Rouillac is a commune in the Charente department in southwestern France. On 1 January 2016, the former communes Plaizac and Sonneville were merged into Rouillac. On 1 January 2019, the former commune Gourville was merged into Rouillac.

Population

See also
Communes of the Charente department

References

Communes of Charente

Communes nouvelles of Charente